The names of Moldavia and Moldova originate from the historical state of Moldavia, which at its greatest extent included eastern Romania (Western Moldavia), Moldova, and parts of south-western and western Ukraine.

Etymology
In Lithuanian language Malduva or Maldava means the land of prayers and originated from Lithuanian word  'a prayer'.

One of the existing theories is that Moldavia/Moldova was named after the Moldova River, which is a Slavic name, derived from Slavic mold-, "spruce, fir". A. I. Sobolevskij derived it from *moldu, "tender, soft, young". The ending -ov(a)/-av(a) is a common Slavic suffix used in appelatives and proper names. -ova denotes ownership, chiefly of feminine nouns. There is significant Slavic influence on Romanian.

The myth, included in works of Grigore Ureche (1590–1647), Miron Costin (1633–1691) and Dimitrie Cantemir (1673–1723), but given varying levels of credibility by these, was that the hunter Dragoș from Maramureș (the founder of Moldavia) in 1359 hunted for wild oxen, accompanied by female dog Molda who chased an ox into the river where the animal was killed and the dog itself drowned in the water; the river and region was named after the dog.

Other theories is that it is derived from old German Molde, meaning "open-pit mine", or the Gothic Mulda meaning "dust", "dirt" (cognate with the English mould), referring to the river.

The short-lived capital of Moldavia, Baia in the Suceava County, was called Stadt Molde in a 1421 German document.

Bogdania
The original and short-lived reference to the region was Bogdania, after Bogdan I, the founding figure of the principality.

Wallachia
The term "Black Wallachia", in Turkish Kara-Eflak, was another name found used for Moldova in the Ottoman period. It derived from Bogdan I of Moldavia; in Ottoman Turkish usage his state was known as Kara-Bogdan and Bogdan-Eflak, "Bogdan's Wallachia".

Republic
Before 1812 the territory of the modern Republic of Moldova was usually called Eastnern Moldova, Eastern Lowlands, Dniester-Prut, Bendery (for the largest town) or Orhei (for the largest town in the middle). Since 1812 the Russians spread the name of the small Bessarabia on it, so that this name became mostly associated with this territory. After the establishment of the Moldovan SSR in the 1940s the new republic started to be unofficially called Moldova and Moldavia. In 1991 that name was adopted as official name, with Moldavia variant quickly preferred in the country itself.

References

Sources

Further reading
 
 
 

Moldova
History of Moldova
Romanian language
History of Moldavia